Covington is a village and civil parish in the council area of South Lanarkshire, Scotland. It is located 33.5 miles south west of Edinburgh, 7 miles south east of Lanark, 36 miles south east of Glasgow. It has a population of 518.

The name "Covington" was first recorded in the late 12th century in the Latin form Villa Colbani, "Colban's or Cowan's village", and 20 years later as Colbaynistun.

References

Villages in South Lanarkshire